Graham Leggat (20 June 1934 – 29 August 2015) was a Scottish international footballer.

Playing career
Born in Aberdeen, Leggat started his career at his home town club as a right winger. He was part of the Aberdeen team that won the Scottish league title in 1954–55 and the 1955–56 Scottish League Cup. In November 2017, he was one of four inductees into the Aberdeen Hall of Fame.

He was transferred to Fulham in 1958 for £16,000, where he formed a right flank partnership with England captain Johnny Haynes. Leggat held the record for the fastest hat-trick in the English league, having scored three goals in three minutes in a 10–1 win for Fulham against Ipswich Town on 26 December 1963. This record was broken in May 2015 by Sadio Mané of Southampton.

He wound down his career with short spells at Birmingham, Rotherham and Bromsgrove Rovers.

International
Leggat was selected in the Scotland squad for the 1958 FIFA World Cup in Sweden, playing in the Scots' matches against Yugoslavia and Paraguay. In total he earned 18 full caps between 1956 and 1960. He also scored six goals for the Scottish League XI in five appearances.

Coaching and media career
After a brief period working as a coach at Aston Villa, in 1971 Leggat emigrated to Canada and served as the first head coach of the Toronto Metros. Several years later he would become vice-president and Managing Director for the Edmonton Drillers from 1979 to 1980.

He began a second career as an analyst on soccer telecasts for the CBC at the 1976 Summer Olympics and at the World Cup. He later became host of TSN's popular Soccer Saturday program as well as an on-air analyst on its soccer telecasts. He was inducted into the Canadian Soccer Hall of Fame in 2001 as a 'builder'. Leggat died in August 2015, aged 81.

Personal life
His son, also named Graham Leggat, was executive director of the San Francisco Film Society from October 2005 until his death in August 2011.

Career statistics

Club

International

International goals
Scores and results list Scotland's goal tally first.

References

Sources

External links

Profile at Canadian Soccer Hall of Fame
International appearances at londonhearts.com Scotland section

1934 births
2015 deaths
Footballers from Aberdeen
Scottish footballers
Association football wingers
Banks O' Dee F.C. players
Aberdeen F.C. players
Fulham F.C. players
Birmingham City F.C. players
Rotherham United F.C. players
Bromsgrove Rovers F.C. players
Toronto Blizzard (1971–1984) players
Scottish Football League players
English Football League players
Scottish Junior Football Association players
North American Soccer League (1968–1984) players
Scotland international footballers
1958 FIFA World Cup players
Scottish Football League representative players
Scotland under-23 international footballers
Scottish expatriate footballers
Expatriate soccer players in Canada
Scottish expatriate sportspeople in Canada
Scottish emigrants to Canada
Scottish football managers
Toronto Blizzard managers
Scottish expatriate football managers
North American Soccer League (1968–1984) commentators
North American Soccer League (1968–1984) coaches
North American Soccer League (1968–1984) executives
Canada Soccer Hall of Fame inductees
Association football commentators
Canadian television sportscasters
Naturalized citizens of Canada